Brayan Alexander García González (born 26 March 1993) is a Honduran footballer. He represented Honduras in youth and senior levels.

References

Honduran footballers
Liga Nacional de Fútbol Profesional de Honduras players
F.C. Motagua players
C.D.S. Vida players
Juticalpa F.C. players
1993 births
Living people
Footballers at the 2016 Summer Olympics
Olympic footballers of Honduras
2015 CONCACAF Gold Cup players
2017 Copa Centroamericana players
Copa Centroamericana-winning players
Association football defenders